Mark Merrill (born May 5, 1955 in Saint Paul, Minnesota-April 12, 2018) was a linebacker in the National Football League. His parents are Verna Anderson Merrill and Walter Leo Kelly Merrill.

Career
Merrill was drafted in the second round of the 1978 NFL Draft by the New York Jets and would split that season between the Jets and the Chicago Bears. After a season away from the NFL, he would spend the 1981 NFL season with the Denver Broncos before splitting the following year between the Broncos and the Green Bay Packers. He spent the next season with the Buffalo Bills before once again splitting the next seasons, this time between the Bills and the Los Angeles Raiders.

He played at the collegiate level at the University of Minnesota.

See also
List of New York Jets players
List of Green Bay Packers players
List of Buffalo Bills players

References

1955 births
Players of American football from Saint Paul, Minnesota
New York Jets players
Chicago Bears players
Denver Broncos players
Green Bay Packers players
Buffalo Bills players
Los Angeles Raiders players
American football linebackers
University of Minnesota alumni
Minnesota Golden Gophers football players
Living people